Aarón Alameda López (born 18 August 1993) is a Mexican professional boxer who challenged for the WBC super bantamweight title in 2020.

Early life
Born into a family of boxers in Nogales, Sonora, Alameda naturally followed them to the gym and began boxing at the age of 13. In his first appearance at the Mexican National Olympics in 2009, he won a gold medal by defeating Diego De La Hoya, the nephew of legendary world champion Oscar De La Hoya, in the finals. The Mexican would get his revenge three years later, defeating Alameda in the same event for the gold. Alameda won gold medals at a total of three National Olympics as well as the 2013 National Championships.

Professional career
Alameda made his professional debut on 5 April 2014, defeating José Luis Leal by third-round technical knockout (TKO) in Magdalena, Sonora. He ended the year with his sixth straight stoppage victory, a first-round knockout (KO) of Iván Vázquez in Monterrey. After six more wins in 2015, he knocked out Missouri native Andre Wilson on 19 January 2016 at the Club Nokia in Los Angeles, his first fight outside of his native Mexico. With a record of 23–0, he received his first title shot on 8 December 2018, defeating Venezuelan veteran Breilor Terán for the WBC FECARBOX interim super bantamweight title on the main event of a Televisa Deportes Sábados de Box card in his hometown of Nogales.

He fought only once in 2019, a third-round KO of Nicaraguan journeyman Jordan Escobar in April. He was scheduled to fight Luis Nery in a Showtime-televised WBC super bantamweight title eliminator in March 2020, but the show was cancelled due to the COVID-19 pandemic. Instead, he faced him six months later, on 26 September, for the vacant WBC super bantamweight title after Rey Vargas was stripped of his belt. After twelve rounds the judges handed Nery a unanimous decision (UD) victory with scores of 110–118, 112–116 and 113–115.

Professional boxing record

References

External links
 

Living people
1993 births
Mexican male boxers
Super-bantamweight boxers
Southpaw boxers
Boxers from Sonora
People from Nogales, Sonora